The 2017–18 Stony Brook Seawolves men's basketball team represented Stony Brook University in the 2017–18 NCAA Division I men's basketball season. The Seawolves were led by second-year head coach Jeff Boals and played their home games at Island Federal Credit Union Arena in Stony Brook, New York as members of the America East Conference. They finished season 13–19, 7–9 in America East play to finish in fifth place. They defeated Albany in the quarterfinals of the America East tournament before losing in the semifinals to Vermont. Freshman forward Elijah Olaniyi won the 2018 America East Rookie of the Year award, averaging 7.5 points and 3.8 rebounds in his debut season.

Previous season
The Seawolves finished the 2016–17 season 18–14, 12–4 in America East play to finish in second place. As the No. 2 seed in the America East tournament, they defeated Binghamton before losing to Albany in the semifinals. They were invited to the College Basketball Invitational where they lost in the first round to UIC.

Offseason

Departures

2017 recruiting class

2018 recruiting class

Preseason 
In a poll by the conference’s nine head coaches (who were not allowed to pick their own team) at the America East media day, the Seawolves were picked to finish in fourth place in the America East.

Roster

Schedule and results

|-
!colspan=9 style=| Non-conference regular season

|-
!colspan=9 style=| America East regular season

|-
!colspan=9 style=| America East tournament

References

Stony Brook Seawolves men's basketball seasons
Stony Brook
Stony Brook Seawolves men's b
Stony Brook Seawolves men's b